Sleep and Release is the second album by Scottish band Aereogramme. It was released in 2003 on Chemikal Underground in the UK and Matador in the USA.

In 2010, vocalist Craig B stated that he has:

Track listing
All songs written by Aereogramme.
 "Indiscretion #243" – 3:43
 "Black Path" – 3:53
 "A Simple Process of Elimination" – 5:48
 "Older" – 5:17
 "No Really, Everything's Fine" – 5:55
 "Wood" – 5:21
 "Yes" – 2:00
 "In Gratitude" – 4:52
 "A Winter's Discord" – 6:32
 "-" – 6:31

References

2003 albums
Aereogramme albums
Chemikal Underground albums